Deserticossus pullus is a moth in the family Cossidae. It is found in China (Xinjiang).

The wingspan is about 33 mm. The forewings are greyish black with four to five black longitudinal stripes in the outer part. The hindwings are uniform dark.

References

Natural History Museum Lepidoptera generic names catalog

Cossinae
Moths described in 2006
Moths of Asia